Curtis Frasca is an American entrepreneur, real estate investor, record label owner, music publisher, and former multi-platinum award-winning record producer, songwriter, musician, studio owner and recording engineer.

Career
Frasca is a former multi-platinum record producer, songwriter, musician, re-mixer, engineer, and instrumentalist. 
Frasca's work appears on over 100 million albums sold worldwide Let Go (Avril Lavigne album), These Are Special Times, Ryan Cabrera, Stories of a Stranger, The Cactus Album, The Immaculate Collection, including those of Avril Lavigne, Celine Dion, 3rd Base, O.A.R., Ryan Cabrera,, De La Soul, Queen Latifah, Moby.

1980
Growing up in New York, Frasca was drumming at an early age. As a teenager, he was heavily influenced by the punk rock & roll, like The Jam, Sex Pistols, MC5, The Clash Ramones. His professional career started while still in high school mixing, recording, programming on such influential records as De La Soul "Say No Go", 3rd Bass "Brooklyn Queens" , "The Gas Face", albums produced by Prince Paul. Other artist's Frasca worked with during this period include Queen Latifah, Big Daddy Kane, Fine Young Cannibals "Good Thing".

1990
Tommy Mottola hired Frasca to produce Mariah Carey's "Someday" for her 1991 American Music Awards appearance, that appearance helped Someday reach Billboard's number #1 in the United States after Mariah Cary's appearance. In the early 1990s Frasca worked heavily with hotel owner Shep PettiboneThe Empress Hotel (New Jersey), a few of the artists included Madonna, Mariah Carey, Michael Jackson, Janet Jackson, Aretha Franklin, Cher, Patti LaBelle, Jeffrey Osborne, Jane Child, Bananarama, Spice Girls, Prince.

Moby requested Frasca mix his major label debut Move, the album entered the Billboard dance chart at number #1 Move (Moby song). Remixing k.d. lang "Lifted by Love" , Sophie B. Hawkins "Right Beside You" , Tangerine Dream, Paul Haslinger amongst many others. 

Frasca founded Verse Entertainment . Verse Entertainment featured a private multi-room facility located NYC - Verse Studio was profiled in MIX magazine October 1999 issue. Verse Studios is a combination of vintage gear and digital recording tools featuring a custom Neve 8058 console from the 1970s and SSL 9000J.

2000
In 2001 after attempts to capture Avril Lavigne sound, Arista A&R head Josh Saurbin reached out to the production and writing team of Frasca and Breer Madonna, Ryan Cabrera, Stacie Orrico) to help, with, the album. Avril Lavigne's debut record Let Go, would go on to sell 22 million albums worldwide and garner 3 Grammy Award nominations. 

2002 Frasca and Sabelle Breer signed Ryan Cabrera producing and co-writing much of his multi-platinum debut, release Take It All Away which debut on at #18 the Billboard 200 album charts. The album included the Top 40 "On The Way Down" and "40 Kinds of Sadness". The single "On the Way Down" went double platinum and received an ASCAP Pop Award for most airplay of 2006.

Frasca wrote "Warm Whispers" with the great, Missy Higgins for her album On A Clear Night. The album entered the charts at number #1.

In 2009, Frasca founded Verse Music Group Verse Music Group. Verse Music Group was an entertainment company based in New York City with a focus on music-related intellectual property rights and related assets. Verse owned over 50,000 copyrights through its acquisition of iconic brands and music catalogs, including Salsoul Records, West End Records, Bethlehem Records and Golden Records. Its platform included featured songs by artists Rod Stewart, Nina Simone, Jennifer Lopez, John 5, Avril Lavigne, Commodores, Tupac and Celine Dion. 

Frasca partnered with (private equity) firm The Wicks Group , "https://www.wicksgroup.com" Raising $75 million to acquire entertainment intellectual property. 2010 the company officially renamed Verse Music Group. 

2015, Frasca and partners The Wicks Group sold Verse Music Group to BMG Rights Management. Terms of the transaction were not disclosed. , 

 The Cactus Album 3rd Bass
 Say No Go" De La Soul
 On the Way Down  Ryan Cabrera
 A Very Special Christmas Celine Dion
 Under My Skin Avril Lavigne

References

External links
 Discogs 
 Allmusic 
 Billboard Magazine News  
 People Magazine  
 The Middle Market 
 The Middle Market 
 Billboard Magazine News  
 Billboard Magazine News  

Living people
American music publishers (people)
American male composers
21st-century American composers
Record producers from New York (state)
21st-century American male musicians
Year of birth missing (living people)